Tabaquite is a parliamentary electoral district in Trinidad and Tobago in the south-west of Trinidad. It has been represented since the 2020 general election by Anita Haynes of the United National Congress.

Constituency profile 
The constituency was created prior to the 1966 general election. It borders the constituencies of Pointe-à-Pierre, Naparima, Couva South, Mayaro, Princes Town, Caroni Central and La Horquetta/Talparo. The main towns are Tabaquite, Piparo, Bonne Aventure, and Gasparillo. It is the country's second largest constituency and is considered a safe seat for the United National Congress. It had an electorate of 28,217 as of 2015.

Members of Parliament 
This constituency has elected the following members of the House of Representatives of Trinidad and Tobago:

Election results

Elections in the 2020s

Elections in the 2010s

References 

Constituencies of the Parliament of Trinidad and Tobago